The Louisville Colonels were a Major League Baseball team in the American Association and National League from 1882 to 1899.

Louisville Colonels has also been the name of several other sports teams:
 Louisville Colonels (minor league baseball), a minor league baseball team from 1901 to 1962 and 1968 to 1972
 Louisville Colonels (NFL), the name by which the Louisville American football franchise was known in 1926
 Louisville Colonels (PBLA), a Professional Basketball League of America team during the 1947–48 season

See also
 Kentucky Colonels (disambiguation)